Frederick Thomas Lord  (11 February 1879 - February 1928) was a British track and field athlete who competed in the 1908 Summer Olympics and the 1912 Summer Olympics. He finished 15th and 21st in the Men's Marathon in his two Olympic games. Lord was the only one to finish both races.

In later life, Lord lived in Cleckheaton and worked for the chemical firm of Crowther & Co. Ltd. While at work in February 1928 he used a knife as a replacement for a shoe-horn. After cutting his heel, he developed septic poisoning and died. He left a widow and four children.

References

1879 births
1928 deaths
Olympic athletes of Great Britain
Athletes (track and field) at the 1908 Summer Olympics
Athletes (track and field) at the 1912 Summer Olympics
British male long-distance runners
British male marathon runners
People from Cleckheaton